Ildefonso Vargas y Abarca, O.E.S.A. or Alonso Vargas y Abarca (1633 – 9 May 1697) was a Roman Catholic prelate who served as Bishop of Comayagua (1677–1697).

Biography
Ildefonso Vargas y Abarca was born in Toledo, Spain in April 1633 and ordained a priest in the Order of Hermits of Saint Augustine on 23 September 1656. On 22 November 1677, he was appointed during the papacy of Pope Innocent XI as Bishop of Comayagua. On 24 February 1679, he was consecrated bishop by Andrés de las Navas y Quevedo, Bishop of Nicaragua. He served as Bishop of Comayagua until his death on 9 May 1697.

References

External links and additional sources
 (for Chronology of Bishops) 
 (for Chronology of Bishops) 

17th-century Roman Catholic bishops in Honduras
Bishops appointed by Pope Innocent XI
1633 births
1697 deaths
People from Toledo, Spain
Augustinian bishops
Roman Catholic bishops of Comayagua